Laleh Khalili is an Iranian American and Professor of International Politics at Queen Mary University of London. She was formerly a Professor of Middle Eastern Politics at the School of Oriental and African Studies at the University of London.

Life 
Khalili received a BS in chemical engineering from the University of Texas in 1991, and a PhD in political science from Columbia University in 2004. Her primary research areas are logistics and trade, infrastructure, policing and incarceration, gender, nationalism, political and social movements, refugees, and diasporas in the Middle East. Her commentary on Middle Eastern and Iranian affairs has been used in several newspapers, including The Washington Post, the San Francisco Chronicle, the Chicago Tribune, the Financial Times, and Agence France-Presse. Khalili writes regularly for Iranian.com and The London Review of Books.

In 2007, Laleh Khalili signed an open letter in support of Haleh Esfandiari. She was part of the anti-racist coalition that reviewed an article by Kamel Daoud on violence against women in Cologne. The collective argued that Daoud used stereotypes and orientalist themes.

Bibliography 
Heroes and Martyrs of Palestine: The Politics of National Commemoration. Cambridge, UK; New York:, 2007. , 
Time in the Shadows: Confinement in Counterinsurgencies. Stanford University Press, USA ; Palo Alto :, 2012. , 
Sinews of War and Trade: Shipping and Capitalism in the Arabian Peninsula. Verso Books, UK; London :, 2020.

Scholarly articles 
“'Fighting Over Drones'” (2012). Middle East Report 264 (Fall): pp. 18–22.
"'Gendered Practices of Counterinsurgency'" (2011). Review of International Studies37(4): 1471–1491.
“'The New (and Old) Classics of Counterinsurgency'” (2010) Middle East Report 255 (Summer): pp. 14–23.
“'The Location of Palestine in Global Counterinsurgencies'” (2010). International Journal of Middle East Studies 42(3): pp. 413–433.
“'On Torture'” (2008). Middle East Report 249 (Winter): pp. 32–38.
"‘Standing with My Brother’: Hizbullah, Palestinians, and the Limits of Solidarity'" (2007). Comparative Studies in Society and History 49(2):276–303.
"Places of Memory and Mourning: Palestinian Commemoration in the Refugee Camps of Lebanon". Comparative Studies of South Asia, Africa and the Middle East  - Volume 25, Number 1, 2005, pp. 30–45

References

External links 

 SOAS faculty page
 How Empire Operates: An Interview with Laleh Khalili, Viewpoint Magazine, February 1, 2018
 Logistics, Counterinsurgency and the War on Terror: An Interview with Laleh Khalili, George Souvlis

Year of birth missing (living people)
Living people
American people of Iranian descent
Columbia Graduate School of Arts and Sciences alumni
Academics of SOAS University of London
American political scientists
Iranian political scientists
Women political scientists